Kanwatheertha Beach Resort is one of many beach resorts in the Kasaragod district of Kerala state, South India. It is 3 km north of Manjeshwar, has a large swimming pool lake, and a beach of 4 km. length. The swimming pool is formed by sea water in the neat vast beach is one of the gifts of nature.

References

Seaside resorts in India
Hotels in Kerala
Tourist attractions in Kasaragod district